Dogboys is a 1998 American-Canadian made-for-television action-thriller film directed by Ken Russell and starring Dean Cain, Tia Carrere and Bryan Brown. It was originally broadcast on Showtime on April 4, 1998.

Plot
Julian is a convict assigned by the sadistic Captain Brown to be a "dog boy"—a human guinea pig used to train attack dogs to hunt down potential escapees.

Cast
Dean Cain as Julian Taylor
Tia Carrere as D.A. Jennifer Dern
Bryan Brown as 	Captain Robert Brown
Sean McCann as Pappy

Production
The film was shot in Toronto in May 1997.

Russell said he was given orders to revisions by "anonymous" execs on the film. "It was change this, alter that – no discussion, 'just do it.' There was no one to talk to...
It paid the rent."

Reception
The Los Angeles Times said "Dialogue is deliriously silly, with the term "dogboy" used so frequently you'd think they're trying to make it a national catch-phrase."

References

External links

Dogboys at Letterbox DVD

1998 television films
1998 films
American action thriller films
Canadian action thriller films
English-language Canadian films
Canadian thriller television films
Films directed by Ken Russell
Showtime (TV network) films
American thriller television films
1990s American films
1990s Canadian films